Wissman is a surname. Notable people with the surname include:

Dave Wissman (born 1941), American baseball player
Johan Wissman (born 1982), Swedish athlete

See also
Wissmann